Innerstate Records (also known as Innerstate) is a San Francisco Bay Area based rock and alternative American record label founded by Russ Tolman and Pat Thomas in 1998.

History

Formed in 1998 by singer/songwriters and producers Russ Tolman and Pat Thomas, Innerstate Records continues today distributing its catalog as a digital label via distributor The Orchard. It spawned two offshoot labels innerSPACE, which specialized in space rock, prog and krautrock and WEED, which was a catch-all for eclectic releases. The labels releases both new recordings and reissues, but is not actively soliciting to sign new acts.

Artists
28th Day
Green on Red
Mushroom (innerSPACE & WEED)
Steve Wynn
Penelope Houston
Barbara Manning & The Go-Luckys
Chris Cacavas
Chris Von Sneidern
Tom Heyman
The Wags
Daevid Allen's University of Errors (innerSPACE)
Dipstick (WEED)
Kim Fowley (WEED)
Brian Ritchie (WEED)
Petty Booka (WEED)
Epic Soundtracks
El Destroyo (Innerstate & WEED)
Okra All-Stars
Gary Floyd
Sister Double Happiness
The Handsome Family
Donner Party
The Walkabouts
Tishamingo
Sonya Hunter
Map of Wyoming
Jill Olson
Go Go Market
Russ Tolman (WEED)
Rockin' Teenage Combo (innerSPACE)
Om Attack (innerSPACE)
Species Being (innerSPACE)
Sid Hillman Quartet
Girls Say Yes
Schramms
Jean Caffeine

References

Record labels based in California
Rock record labels
Alternative rock record labels